Stephan André Vermeulen (born ) is a South African rugby union player that played for  between 2016 and 2017, making four appearances. His regular position is lock.

References

Alumni of Monument High School
South African rugby union players
Living people
1994 births
Rugby union players from Pretoria
Rugby union locks
Griquas (rugby union) players